Institutiones Divinae (The Divine Institutes) is the name of a theological work by the Christian Roman philosopher Lactantius, written between AD 303 and 311.

Contents

Arguably the most important of Lactantius's works, the Divinae institutionesthe title of which was meant to correspond to the institutiones that expressed the workings of civil lawis both a systematic as well as apologetic work that, as Patrick Healy argues, "point out the futility of pagan beliefs and to establish the reasonableness and truth of Christianity." The work was the first full attempt to defend Christian theology in Latin, and it was likely written to appeal to and convince educated pagans. While Lactantius focused much of Divinae institutiones on combating the claims of pagan writers (who at the time were aiding the persecutors of Christianity by writing specialized attack pamphlets), the author also sought to make his work "sufficiently broad" so that it might stem criticisms from all directions.

Sources

Book VII of the work indicates a familiarity with Jewish, Christian, Egyptian and Iranian apocalyptic material, and alludes to the (now-lost) Oracle of Hystaspes. The work also makes use of Sibylline sources as well as the Hermetica of Hermes Trismegistus. Included in this treatise is also a quote from the nineteenth of the Odes of Solomon, one of only two known texts of the Odes until the early twentieth century.

Reception

Patrick Healy notes, "The strengths and the weakness of Lactantius are nowhere better shown than in his work. The beauty of the style, the choice and aptness of the terminology, cannot hide the author's lack of grasp on Christian principles and his almost utter ignorance of Scripture." Lactantius's mockery of the idea of a round earth was criticized by Copernicus in the preface to his book De revolutionibus orbium coelestium, in which the author writes, "Lactantius, the writer celebrated in other ways but very little in mathematics, spoke somewhat childishly of the shape of the earth when he derided those who declared the earth had the shape of a ball" (Lactantium, celebrem alioqui scriptorem, sed Mathematicum parum, admodum pueriliter de forma terræ loqui, cum deridet eos, qui terram globi formam habere prodiderunt).

According to the World Digital Library, Divinae institutiones was one of the first books to be printed in Italy, as well as the first Italian imprint to be dated.

References

Bibliography

External links
 Full text at New Advent
 Incomplete text at Wikisource
 Scanned full text images of a  Latin incunable at World Digital Library

4th-century Christian texts
4th-century Latin books
Christian apocalyptic writings
Christian apologetic works
Christianity and paganism
Christian philosophy
Flat Earth
Italian manuscripts